"Bad Day" is a song by American rock band Fuel, originally released from their second album, Something Like Human (2000), as the third single in May 2001. It was the final single released from Something Like Human and peaked at number 64 on the US Billboard Hot 100 chart that year. Immediately following the September 11 attacks, Clear Channel deemed the song inappropriate for radio airplay because of its lyrical content.

Background and composition
Written by guitarist Carl Bell, "Bad Day" was written before the band was signed to a major label. The band tried to record a version for their major label debut, but according to lead singer Brett Scallions, "We tried recording 'Bad Day' back when we did the Sunburn album [in 1998] and just didn’t get it right. It was a song that was with us way before we signed on with Sony and Epic." According to the song's sheet music, the track is written in the key of A major, possessing a medium rock tempo that proceeds at common time.

Music video
A music video was made for the song. At the beginning, lead vocalist Brett Scallions sits across a man with a cane and starts singing. The scene then changes to a woman who suffers various misfortunes, including spilling her coffee, breaking a heel on the sidewalk, and getting into a car accident. Throughout these scenes, Scallions becomes more emotional as he sings to the man, who writes in a book. At the video's conclusion, the woman walks into the room Scallions is in but fades away after she sits down beside him. As Scallions walks out, the man discovers the woman's now-fixed heels on the floor. The video was added to VH1's playlist on the week ending June 3, 2001, and to the playlists of MTV and MTV2 the following week.

Track listing
All songs were written by Bell except where noted.

Australian maxi-CD single
 "Bad Day" – 3:15
 "Down" (rehearsal demo)  – 3:24
 "Hemorrhage (In My Hands)" (rehearsal demo) – 3:58
 "Bad Day" (acoustic) – 3:08

Credits and personnel
Credits are lifted from the US promo CD liner notes and the Something Like Human booklet.

Studios
 Recorded at Right Track Recording, Sear Sound (New York City), and The Mix Room (Los Angeles)
 Mixed at The Mix Room (Los Angeles)
 Mastered at Precision Mastering (Los Angeles)

Personnel

 Carl Bell – writing, guitar, vocals, co-production
 Brett Scallions – lead vocals, guitar
 Jeff Abercrombie – bass guitar
 Kevin Miller – drums
 Ben Grosse – production, recording, mixing, programming
 John Parthum – recording
 Lloyd Puckitt – recording
 Jason Stasium – additional recording
 Lumpy – programming
 Tom Baker – mastering

Charts

Weekly charts

Year-end charts

Release history

References

Fuel (band) songs
2000 songs
2001 singles
Epic Records singles
Songs written by Carl Bell (musician)
Songs about heartache